The first series of RuPaul's Drag Race UK began airing on 3 October 2019 on the BBC Three section of BBC iPlayer and WOW Presents Plus's WOW Presents Plus streaming service. It ran  for eight episodes.

The winner of first series of RuPaul's Drag Race UK was The Vivienne, with Divina de Campo as the runner-up.

The song "Break Up (Bye Bye)", which was featured in the fifth episode, was released as a single and reached number 35 on the UK Singles Chart. It also peaked at number 44 on the Billboard Hot Dance/Electronic Songs chart in the US.

Contestants 

Ages, names, and cities stated are at time of filming.

Future Appearances

Baga Chipz, Cheryl Hole, and Blu Hydrangea competed on UK vs the World. The Vivienne competed on US All Stars 7.Crystal appeared as a mentor in Call Me Mother seasons one and two.

Contestant progress

Lip syncs
Legend:

Guest judges 
Listed in chronological order:

Andrew Garfield, actor
Maisie Williams, actress
Twiggy, model and fashion designer
Geri Halliwell, singer
Jade Thirlwall, singer
Cheryl, singer, television personality and dancer
 Michaela Coel, actress

Special guests
Guests who appeared in episodes, but did not judge on the main stage.

Episode 3
Raven, runner-up of both RuPaul's Drag Race Season 2 and All Stars 1

Episode 4
Stacey Dooley, investigative journalist
Lorraine Kelly, television presenter

Episode 5
MNEK, singer and music producer

Episode 6

Katya, contestant from RuPaul's Drag Race Season 7 and runner-up of All Stars 2

Episode 8
AJ and Curtis Pritchard, ballroom dancers

Episodes

Reception 

The series received very positive reviews from critics, with The Guardian describing the series as having "saved RuPaul's Drag Race" as the recent seasons have had a less than positive reception. In their review of the series, iNews awarded the series "five stars" and described it as a "roaring success", despite criticising its omission of a stand-up comedy challenge.

In a more critical review, Vulture stated in its review of the finale that although the season "may have hit some true highs... it couldn’t save Drag Race from its worst impulses".

References 

2019 British television seasons
2019 in LGBT history
RuPaul's Drag Race UK seasons